Petricia is a genus of sea stars belonging to the family Asteropseidae.

The species of this genus are found in Australia.

Species:
 Petricia imperialis (Farquhar, 1897) 
 Petricia vernicina (Lamarck, 1816)

References

Asteropseidae
Asteroidea genera